The Associated Actors and Artistes of America (4As), established in 1919, is the federation of trade unions for performing artists in the United States.  

The union was established by the merger of the Actors' Equity Association and the White Rats of America.  By the mid-1940s, its affiliates were:

 Actors' Equity Association
 American Federation of Radio Artists
 American Guild of Musical Artists
 American Guild of Variety Artists
 Brother Artists Association
 Chorus Equity Association
 Hebrew Chorus Union
 Hungarian Actors' and Artists' Association
 Italian Actors' Union
 Screen Actors' Guild

As of 2022, the following unions belong to the 4As: 
 The Actors' Equity Association (AEA)
 The American Guild of Musical Artists (AGMA)
 The American Guild of Variety Artists (AGVA)
 The Guild of Italian American Actors (GIAA)
 The Screen Actors Guild-American Federation of Television and Radio Artists (SAG-AFTRA)

The organization is a member of the AFL–CIO. The 4As splits its votes in AFL-CIO elections based on the wishes of each member union. The current AAAA member unions of the AFL–CIO are: AEA, AGMA, GIAA, and SAG-AFTRA. The well-known performer and civil rights activist Theodore Bikel was President of the 4As until his death in 2015.

On June 1, 2014, Department for Professional Employees, AFL–CIO (DPE) took over administrative functions of the 4As, as per an April 15, 2014, agreement between the DPE and the 4As. As part of the agreement, AGVA and GIAA affiliated with the DPE. AGMA, already a DPE affiliate, AGVA, and GIAA remain AFL-CIO affiliates through the 4As. The other two 4As members, AEA and SAG-AFTRA, previously received direct charters from the AFL-CIO. DPE President Paul Almeida became the Executive Secretary of the 4As .

Officers
At the 4As convention on December 2, 2015, the following 4As officers were elected:

 President – Jason McMillin, SAG-AFTRA;
 1st Vice President – David White, SAG-AFTRA;
 2nd Vice President – Mary McColl, AEA;
 3rd Vice President – Susanne Doris – AGVA Delegate;
 4th Vice President – Deborah Alton Maher, AGMA Delegate;
 5th Vice President – Carson Grant, GIAA;
 Treasurer – Mary Lou Westerfield, AEA;
 Executive Secretary – Paul E. Almeida, DPE

References

Entertainment industry unions
National trade union centers of the United States
AFL–CIO
Trade unions established in 1919
1919 establishments in the United States